Lynne Roberts, also credited as Mary Hart, born Theda May Roberts (November 22, 1922 – April 1, 1978) was an American film actress during the Golden Age of Hollywood. She appeared exclusively in what were referred to as B-movies.

Early years
Born in El Paso, Texas, Roberts was the daughter of Hobart M. Roberts, a bookkeeper, and May Holland. The family moved to Los Angeles in the 1920s.

Career
Roberts began working as an actress in the 1930s, under contract to Republic Pictures.  At the age of 14, in 1936, she played a role in Bulldog Edition. In 1938, at age 16, she starred in the cliffhangers: The Lone Ranger and Dick Tracy Returns, and played a role in The Higgins Family.  She was officially listed in studio records as having been born in 1919.
 
In 1941 she starred with Sonja Henie and John Payne in Sun Valley Serenade, while under contract to 20th Century-Fox. She returned to Republic Pictures in 1944, and stayed under contract there until 1948. She starred with Gene Autry in Sioux City Sue in 1946, and appeared in two more films with Autry: Robin Hood of Texas and Saddle Pals, as well as three films with Roy Rogers, and one with Monte Hale. (Johnny D. Boggs, in his book, Billy the Kid on Film, 1911-2012, wrote, "Lynne Roberts would co-star with [Roy] Rogers in eight Westerns, billed as Mary Hart in the first seven of those.")

After leaving Republic Pictures for the second time, Roberts worked with Autry in outdoor adventures for Columbia Pictures. She also worked with Kirby Grant in Monogram Pictures' mounted-police adventures, and with  Tim Holt at RKO Radio Pictures.

Roberts appeared in 64 films in total. Of those, 21 were westerns, and two were serials.

Personal life

Roberts married four times. Her first marriage was to William Engelbert, Jr., an aircraft company official, with whom she had one son, Bill. The marriage ended in divorce in 1944.

Her second marriage was to Louis John Gardella, which also ended in divorce. In court, Gardella's attorney argued that the couple's Arizona wedding was invalid because Roberts was not legally divorced from Engelbert, although Roberts claimed she had a Mexican divorce decree.

In 1953, Roberts married brassiere manufacturer Hyman B. Samuels, with whom she had a daughter, Peri Margaret and a son, William Edward. The couple divorced November 14, 1961, in Los Angeles, California.

Following that divorce, Roberts retired from acting and later married pro wrestler and motion picture actor Don Sebastian in 1971. She died in Sherman Oaks in 1978 and is buried in Forest Lawn Memorial Park, Glendale.

Partial filmography

 Mama Runs Wild (1937) as Edith Summers
 Dangerous Holiday (1937) as Jean Robbins
 The Higgins Family (1938) as Marian Higgins
 Call the Mesquiteers (1938) as Madge Irving
 Hollywood Stadium Mystery (1938) as Edna Mayberry
 The Lone Ranger (1938) as Joan Blanchard
 Billy the Kid Returns (1938) (billed as Mary Hart) as Ellen Moore
 Come On, Rangers (1938) (as Mary Hart)  as Janice Forbes
 Shine On, Harvest Moon (1938) (as Mary Hart) as Claire Brower
 The Mysterious Miss X (1939) (as Mary Hart) as Julie Graham
 Rough Riders' Round-up (1939) as Dorothy Blair
 Southward Ho (1939) as Ellen Denbigh
 Frontier Pony Express (1939) as Ann Langhorne
 My Wife's Relatives (1939) as Jean Higgins
 In Old Caliente (1939) as Jean Higgins
 Should Husbands Work? (1939) as Jean Higgins
 Everything's on Ice (1939) as Jane Barton
 High School (1940) as Carol Roberts
 Star Dust (1940) as College girl
 Street of Memories (1940) as Catherine 'Kitty' Foster
 Hi-Yo Silver (1940) as Joan Blanchard
 The Bride Wore Crutches (1941) as Midge Lambert
 Romance of the Rio Grande (1941) as Maria Cordova
 Riders of the Purple Sage (1941) as Bess
 Moon Over Miami (1941) as Jennie May
 Last of the Duanes (1941) as Nancy Bowdrey
 Young America (1942) as Elizabeth Barnes
 The Man in the Trunk (1942) as Peggy LaRue
 Dr. Renault's Secret (1942) as Madeline Renault
 Quiet Please, Murder (1942) as Kay Ryan
 The Big Bonanza (1944) as Judy Parker
 My Buddy (1944) as Lucy Manners
 The Ghost That Walks Alone (1944) as Sue McGuire Grant
 The Port of 40 Thieves (1944) as Nancy Hubbard Chaney
 The Phantom Speaks (1945) as Joan Renwick
 The Chicago Kid (1945) as Chris Mitchell
 Behind City Lights (1945) as Jean Lowell
 Girls of the Big House (1945) as Jeanne Crail
 Winter Wonderland (1946) as Nancy Wheeler
 The Magnificent Rogue (1946) as Pat Brown Morgan
 Sioux City Sue (1946) as Sue Warner
 The Pilgrim Lady (1947) as Henrietta Rankin
 That's My Gal (1947) as Natalie Adams
 Saddle Pals (1947) as Shelly Brooks
 Robin Hood of Texas (1947) as Virginia
 Madonna of the Desert (1948) as Monica Dale
 Lightnin' in the Forest (1948) as Jerri Vail
 Secret Service Investigator (1948) as Susan Lane
 The Timber Trail (1948) as Alice Baker
 Eyes of Texas (1948) as Nurse Penny Thatcher
 Sons of Adventure (1948) as Jean
 Trouble Preferred (1948) as Madge Walker
 The Great Plane Robbery (1950) as Mary
 The Blazing Sun (1950) as Helen Ellis
 Call of the Klondike (1950) as Emily Mallory
 Hunt the Man Down (1950) as Sally Clark
 Dynamite Pass (1950) as Mrs. Mary Madden
 Because of You (1952) as Rosemary Balder
 The Blazing Forest (1952) as Grace Hanson
 Port Sinister (1953) as Joan Hunter

References

External links

B-Western Heroines, Lynne Roberts

People from El Paso, Texas
Actresses from Texas
Accidental deaths from falls
Accidental deaths in California
American film actresses
1922 births
1978 deaths
Burials at Forest Lawn Memorial Park (Hollywood Hills)
20th Century Studios contract players
20th-century American actresses